The Santuario della Madonna della Bocciola is in Ameno municipality, Province of Novara, Italy.

The sanctuary rises up where tradition attributes the setting for a miracle: in 1543 the Virgin Mary appeared to a young shepherdess, Giulia Manfredi, and told her that she would help the village if the inhabitants prayed and did not work on Saturday.

The church was progressively enlarged up to the most recent neoclassical architecture.

See also 
 CoEur - In the heart of European paths

References

External links
 Information about the sanctuary

Buildings and structures in Piedmont
Tourist attractions in Piedmont
Buildings and structures in the Province of Novara